Yaniuvis López Sago (born 1 February 1986) is a Cuban athlete whose specialty is the shot put. She represented her country at four World Championships, in 2009, 2013, 2015 and 2017 without qualifying for the final on any occasion. In addition, she has won multiple medals on regional level.

In early 2010, López was diagnosed with acute leukemia. She, however, made a full recovery and returned to competition in 2012.

Her personal best in the event is 18.92 metres set in Havana in 2017.

Competition record

References

External links

1986 births
Living people
Place of birth missing (living people)
Cuban female shot putters
World Athletics Championships athletes for Cuba
Athletes (track and field) at the 2015 Pan American Games
Athletes (track and field) at the 2019 Pan American Games
Pan American Games competitors for Cuba
Athletes (track and field) at the 2016 Summer Olympics
Olympic athletes of Cuba
Central American and Caribbean Games silver medalists for Cuba
Competitors at the 2014 Central American and Caribbean Games
Competitors at the 2018 Central American and Caribbean Games
Central American and Caribbean Games medalists in athletics
20th-century Cuban women
21st-century Cuban women